Hannahs Creek is a  long 3rd order tributary to the Uwharrie River, in Randolph County, North Carolina.

Course
Hannahs Creek forms at the confluence of South and North Prong Hannahs Creek at the south end of the Birkhead Mountain Wilderness in Randolph County, North Carolina.  Hannahs Creek then flows west to meet the Uwharrie River about 4 miles southeast of Martha.

Watershed
Hannahs Creek drains  of area, receives about 47.1 in/year of precipitation, has a topographic wetness index of 334.41 and is about 91% forested.

See also
List of rivers of North Carolina

References

Rivers of North Carolina
Rivers of Randolph County, North Carolina